Leptophloeus angustulus is a species of lined flat bark beetle in the family Laemophloeidae. It is found in North America.

References

Further reading

 
 
 
 
 
 
 
 
 
 
 
 

Laemophloeidae
Beetles described in 1866